Karwice  is a village in the administrative district of Gmina Malechowo, within Sławno County, West Pomeranian Voivodeship, in north-western Poland.

Notable residents
 Franz Pieper (1852-1931), Lutheran theologian

See also
 History of Pomerania

References

Villages in Sławno County